"Prolly" is a song recorded by American R&B singer Sevyn Streeter and American rapper Gucci Mane. The song was released as the lead single for Girl Disrupted on August 12, 2016 through Atlantic Records.

Music video
The audio video for "Prolly" was released to Streeter's YouTube channel on August 12, 2016. The music video was released to YouTube on August 15, 2016.

Track listings and formats

Commercial performance
The song entered the R&B/Hip-Hop Airplay chart at number fifty on October 8, 2016.

Charts

Release history

References

2016 singles
2016 songs
Sevyn Streeter songs
Gucci Mane songs
Songs written by Gucci Mane
Songs written by Sevyn Streeter
Atlantic Records singles